Ann Dusenberry (born September 13, 1953) is an American film, stage and television actress.

Biography

Early Life and Education
Ann Dusenberry was born in Tucson, Arizona as the daughter of Bruce and Katie Dusenberry. Dusenberry studied theater arts for four years, first at the University of Arizona, then Occidental College, where she earned her degree. She got her first role by circulating her resume and photograph within the Universal Studios offices using internal envelopes obtained by her boyfriend, a truck driver for Universal. She then signed a seven-year contract with Universal.

Acting career
Ann Dusenberry played Amory (alias Angel Collins) in Stonestreet: Who Killed the Centerfold Model? (1977), and Amy March in Little Women in a two-part miniseries on NBC in 1978, and returned to the role in a full series the next year. In 1978, she appeared as beauty queen Tina Wilcox in Jaws 2. She co-starred as Lucy Barker’s daughter Margot McGibbon in the short-lived 1986 Lucille Ball series Life with Lucy.

Personal life
She is married to composer Brad Fiedel, whom she lives with in Santa Barbara, California; they have two daughters named Alixandra and Zoe. She received an MA degree in Marriage and Family Therapy, and works as Artistic Director of the Actors’ Conservatory Theatre in Santa Barbara.

Filmography

Film

Television

Theatre
 Our Town (1998) - Mrs Gibbs
 Noises Off (2014)
 Full Circle (2020) 
 Ripcord (2021)

References

External links

 

Living people
Actresses from Tucson, Arizona
Actresses from Arizona
Occidental College alumni
University of Arizona alumni
21st-century American women
Year of birth missing (living people)